We Are Still Here is an Australian-New Zealand anthology film released in 2022. Created as a response to the 250th anniversary of the Second voyage of James Cook to Australia in 1772, the project consists of ten linked short films by each of ten Indigenous Australian and Māori filmmakers about the impact of settler colonialism on the region's indigenous cultures.

The films were directed by Beck Cole, Dena Curtis, Tracey Rigney, Danielle MacLean, Tim Worrall, Renae Maihi, Miki Magasiva, Mario Gaoa, Richard Curtis and Chantelle Burgoyne, and span a range of approaches including historical war drama, futuristic speculative fiction and animation.

It premiered as the opening film of the 2022 Sydney Film Festival, and had its North American premiere in the Contemporary World Cinema program at the 2022 Toronto International Film Festival on September 10, 2022.

References

External links 
 

2022 films
Australian anthology films
New Zealand anthology films
Films about Aboriginal Australians
Films about Māori people
2020s Australian films